Clarisse Mattos Abujamra (born 3 April 1948) is a Brazilian actress, choreographer, and theatre director. She is most known for her roles in Chega da Saudade (2007), A Coleção Invisível (2012), and Como Nossos Pais (2018).

Her uncle was actor Antônio Abujamra, and is André Abujamra's cousin. She was married to fellow actor Antônio Fagundes from 1973 to 1988, with whom she had three children: Dinah, Antônio and Diana.

Filmography

Television

Film

Awards and accolades

References

1948 births
Living people
Brazilian people of Lebanese descent
Actresses from São Paulo
Brazilian telenovela actresses
Brazilian film actresses